Finta is a commune in Dâmbovița County, Muntenia, Romania with a population of 4,574 people. It is composed of four villages: Bechinești, Finta Mare (the commune center), Finta Veche and Gheboaia.

References

Communes in Dâmbovița County
Localities in Muntenia